Prince Aimone may refer to:
 Prince Aimone, Duke of Aosta (1900–1948), Italian nobleman and naval officer
 Prince Aimone, Duke of Apulia (born 1967), Italian nobleman and businessman